Otar Chkheidze (28 November 1920. Village Kelktseuli, region of Gori, Georgia – 2007) Georgian writer, literary man, PhD (1949).

His father and uncles fell a victim to the redoubtable and tragic events of 1924 in Georgia caused by communist regime. The family was raided and evicted from homeland. He graduated from the high school in Tbilisi in 1938. In 1942 he graduated from the Tbilisi State University, the faculty of Philology – West European languages and literature. For a while he was a teacher in a village. From 1948 he was a visiting professor at Shota Rustaveli Batumi State Institute, from 1949 – in Nikoloz Baratashvili Gori State Pedagogical Institute. From 1949 to 1971 he was the head of the Chair of Russian Language and Literature, from 1971 to 1980 he was the head of the Chair of Foreign Languages and Literature. He also occupied the positions of executive secretary of the Georgian Writers' Union in 1950–1951 years, and of the member of editorial board of literary magazines "Mnatobi", "Ciskari" and literary newspaper "Literaturuli Sakartvelo" –  (successively) from 40s to 90s until this social work became senseless. He published his first story in 1940 in the magazine "Chveni Taoba". Since then his works are being published successively: the story cycle “Sketches from my Village”, novel cycle “Kartli Cronicles”(the Georgian Cronicles): “Tiniskhidi”, book I-III, 1950–1955; “Mist”, 1955; “The Dike”, 1956; “The Shoal”, 1958; “Kvernaki”, 1965; “Rise and Decent”, 1967; “Phantoms”, 1968; “Dusty Wind”, 1974 (Giorgi Shengelaia shot a film after this novel “The Journey of a Young Composer", 1985); "Tskhratskaro", 1980; "Mountain Range", 1984 etc.]. Otar Chkheidze is the author of dramatic works, plays: “Whose is Visi?” (staged in 1964), “Old Romances” (staged in 1966), “Tevdore” (staged in 1967), “Ketevan” (staged in 1970); biographies: “Novel and History” (1965, 1976), “Italian Journals of Byron”, etc.; He is also the author of the works of criticism. His recent novels: “Artistic Revolution”, “White Bear”, “Bermuda Triangle”, “2001”, “Humiliated” and the latest 22nd novel “Laser Show” (2005) describe the events that took place in the period of the post communist regime in Georgia. Each of these works are created right after the historical events took place and indeed true chronicles written as a work of art which will be handed over to the next generation, the chronicles created by impartial contemporary. His works are translated in Russian, and also in the languages of the peoples of former Soviet Union. They are also translated in Bulgarian. He is awarded by a Literary Prize "Saba" (2005) and "Ilia Chavchavadze" Reward (2006). Both of the prizes he received for the important contribution he made to Literature.

References

 R. Kverechkhiladze, GSE, volume . 11, page. 175, Tbilisi., 1987

Writers from Georgia (country)
1920 births
2007 deaths
Soviet writers